Wiatrołuża is a river of northeastern Poland. It discharges into the lake Pierty, which is connected with Wigry Lake.

Rivers of Poland
Rivers of Podlaskie Voivodeship